Goosnargh is a civil parish in the City of Preston, Lancashire, England.  It contains 49 listed buildings that are recorded in the National Heritage List for England.  Of these, four are at Grade II*, the middle grade, and the others are at Grade II, the lowest grade.  The parish contains the villages of Inglewhite and Whitechapel, and part of the village of Goosnargh, but is otherwise completely rural.  The listed buildings are mainly houses and associated structures, farmhouses, and farm buildings.  The other listed buildings include churches, cross bases, sundials, a public house, and a school.

Key

Buildings

References

Citations

Sources

Lists of listed buildings in Lancashire
Buildings and structures in the City of Preston